Jeong Yun-hui (born June 4, 1954) is a former South Korean actress active since 1975. She was born in Tongyeong, a southwestern coastal city of South Gyeongsang province, South Korea in 1954. After graduation from Hyehwa Girls' High School, Jeong debuted as an actress in 1975 as starring in Yokmang directed by Lee Gyeong-tae. Jeong was commonly referred to as one of the "New Troika" or "Second Troika" along with her rival actresses, Chang Mi-hee and Yu Ji-in of the 1970s and 1980s after the "First Troika", Moon Hee, Nam Jeong-im, and Yoon Jeong-hee of the 1960s.

Filmography
*Note; the whole list is referenced.

Awards
 1982, the 18th, Baeksang Arts Awards : Best Film Actress for Parrot Cries with Its Body (앵무새 몸으로 울었다)
 1981, the 20th, Grand Bell Awards : Best Actress for Parrot Cries with Its Body
 1981, the 17th, Baeksang Arts Awards : Best TV Actress for The One I Love (사랑하는 사람아)
 1980, the 19th, Grand Bell Awards : Best Actress for Does Cuckoo Cry at Night (뻐꾸기도 밤에 우는가)

References

External links

1954 births
Living people
Actresses from Seoul
20th-century South Korean actresses
South Korean film actresses
South Korean television actresses
Best Actress Paeksang Arts Award (film) winners